Lotus identifies various plant taxa:

 Nelumbo,  a genus of aquatic plants with showy flowers
 Nelumbo nucifera, the Sacred or Indian lotus
 Nelumbo lutea, the American or yellow lotus
 Certain species of Nymphaea (water lilies or Egyptian lotuses):
 Nymphaea caerulea, also known as blue lotus
 Nymphaea lotus, white lotus or sacred lotus
 Nymphaea nouchali, also known as blue or star lotus (sometimes thought to be the same species as Nymphaea caerulea above)
 Lotus (genus) (including bird's-foot trefoils and deervetches), a terrestrial genus with small flowers
 Saussurea (snow lotus), a herbaceous species from the Himalayan vicinity
 Ziziphus lotus, a shrub species with edible fruit
 Diospyros lotus (date-plum, Caucasian persimmon) a tree with edible fruit

See also 
 Lotus (disambiguation)
 Lotus tree, the mythological incarnation of Lotis
 Sacred lotus